Great Ryburgh is a village and former civil parish, now in the parish of Ryburgh, in the North Norfolk district, in the county of Norfolk, England. In 1961 the parish had a population of 484. On 1 April 1987 the parish was abolished and merged with Little Ryburgh to form "Ryburgh".

The villages name means 'Rye town'.

It is located about two miles south-east of the market town of Fakenham. The River Wensum flows through the village. The village has a large maltings which has been producing malt on a traditional malting floor for two centuries. The village and maltings were formerly served by Ryburgh station on the Great Eastern Railway branch from Wymondham and East Dereham to Fakenham and Wells-next-the-Sea. This line is proposed for restoration, as far as Fakenham, by the Norfolk Orbital Railway.

The church of Great Ryburgh St. Andrew is one of 124 surviving round-tower churches in Norfolk.

The Boar Inn is located in Great Ryburgh and is a traditional English country inn, with low-beamed ceilings and an inglenook fireplace in the bar.

An Anglo-Saxon  cemetery was discovered in 2016 by a Museum of London Archaeology excavation that was largely funded by Historic England. The waterlogged conditions of the site led to the remarkable preservation of burials including 6 plank-lined graves and 81 hollowed tree-trunk coffins dating from the 7th-9th century AD. The evidence is this may have been a community of early Christians, including a timber structure thought to be a church or chapel.

References

External links

St Andrew's on the European Round Tower Churches Website
St Andrew's Church website with extensive local history
Extensive history and photographs of Gt Ryburgh watermill
History of Southmylle - Gt Ryburgh's early watermill
Brief history of Gt Ryburgh's windmill

Villages in Norfolk
Former civil parishes in Norfolk
North Norfolk